FIIG may stand for:

FIIG Securities, an Australian investment firm
International Federation for the Graphical Industries, a former global union federation